Martin Jackuliak (born 13 September 1991) is a Slovak football midfielder who currently plays for MFK Lokomotíva Zvolen.

Early career
He made his Corgoň Liga debut for FC Nitra against FC Spartak Trnava, on 2 March 2013, Nitra loss this match 0 - 2.

External links

Eurofotbal profile

References

1991 births
Living people
Slovak footballers
Association football midfielders
ŠK Slovan Bratislava players
FC Nitra players
Slovak Super Liga players
Sportspeople from Rimavská Sobota